Sad Love Story is a 2005 South Korean television drama series starring Kwon Sang-woo, Kim Hee-sun and Yeon Jung-hoon. It aired on MBC from January 5 to March 17, 2005 on Wednesdays and Thursdays at 21:55 for 20 episodes.

Plot
From the moment they meet, Jon-young (Kwon Sang-woo) and the blind Hye-in (Kim Hee-sun) share an instant connection. Young and naïve, they believe that nothing can change their love. Life, however, pulls them in opposite directions. Jon-young is sent to Seoul, while Hye-in immigrates to America. Misleadingly informed that Jon-young is dead, Hye-in struggles to begin a new life alone. Years later, Hye-in returns to Seoul. With her eyesight restored, she is now a singer happily engaged to her producer Gun-woo (Yeon Jung-hoon). Everything changes though when Gun-woo's composer friend turns out to be none other than Jon-young. He instantly recognizes her, but Hye-in has never seen Jun-young before. When love is no longer simple and blind, can Hye-in and Jun-young still find their way back to each other? This series is a series of love, death and suspense.

Cast
Choi/Seo family
Kwon Sang-woo as Seo Joon-young / Choi Joon-kyu
Yoo Seung-ho as young Joon-young
Yoo Seung-ho as Joon-young's son 
Na Young-hee as Seo Hyang-ja, his mother
Lee Young-ha as Choi Joon-il, his father

Park family
Kim Hee-sun as Park Hye-in 
Kim So-eun as young Park Hye-in
Jin Hee-kyung as Audrey / Lee Mi-sook, her aunt

Lee family
Yeon Jung-hoon as Lee Gun-woo
Jo Kyung-hwan as Lee Kang-in, his father
Lee Yeon-soo as Lee Soo-ji, his handicapped, older sister
Lee Jong-won as Oh Sang-jin, Soo-ji's husband

Cha family
Kim Yeon-joo as Cha Hwa-jung
Go Ah-sung as young Hwa-jung 
Lee Mi-young as Hwang Min-kyung, her mother
Kang Nam-gil as Cha Chang-man, her father, a taxi driver

Extended cast
Jung Woo as Lee Min-ho, a small-time gangster who likes Hwa-jung
MC Mong as Jang Jin-pyo, Joon-young and Gun-woo's friend
Lee Hyun-woo as Jang-ho, guitar player
Lee Da-hee as Kang Shin-hee, Gun-woo's NYC friend
Choi Ran as Sook-ja
Hong Seok-cheon as Charlie
Yang Geum-seok as Gun-woo's deceased mother
Baek Bong-ki as Yong-chul
Kim Hee-jung as Choi Joon-il's girlfriend
Ha Seok-jin as Ha Seok-jin
Kim Sung-oh

Production
The series originally cast actor Song Seung-heon to play the character Gun-woo. Song had already filmed several scenes overseas and recorded songs for the soundtrack, when a draft-dodging scandal involving him broke out, causing him to enlist in the military service. On short notice, Yeon Jung-hoon was selected as his replacement.

It received average 16.3% ratings in South Korea. It attracted much attention when it was broadcast in Japan and Middle East.

International broadcast
The series aired in Japan on Fuji TV in August 2005 every Saturday at 4:00 p.m. where it received ratings around 10%. According to a poll conducted by TV Asahi variety show SMAP Station in May 2007, Sad Love Story ranked as the sixth most popular Korean drama in Japan.

References

External links
 Sad Love Story official MBC website 
 

2005 South Korean television series debuts
2006 South Korean television series endings
Korean-language television shows
MBC TV television dramas
South Korean romance television series
South Korean melodrama television series
Television series by Kim Jong-hak Production